David Orlando (born 13 October 1971) is a retired Swiss football striker.

References

1971 births
Living people
Swiss men's footballers
FC Monthey players
FC Sion players
FC Basel players
Étoile Carouge FC players
FC Lugano players
AC Bellinzona players
FC Martigny-Sports players
Association football forwards
Swiss Super League players
Switzerland under-21 international footballers